Peter Crook (born January 9, 1993 in Tortola, British Virgin Islands) is a British Virgin Islander freestyle skier who has competed since 2009 in the halfpipe discipline. Crook has qualified to compete for the British Virgin Islands at the 2014 Winter Olympics in Sochi, becoming the second ever Winter Olympian to represent the country.

Crook and his family moved to Wisconsin, United States in 2001, where he picked up skiing. In 2008, he moved to Colorado and became a professional freestyle skier.

See also
British Virgin Islands at the 2014 Winter Olympics

References

1993 births
Living people
Freestyle skiers at the 2014 Winter Olympics
Olympic freestyle skiers of the British Virgin Islands
British Virgin Islands freestyle skiers
British Virgin Islands male skiers